List of military divisions – List of Finnish divisions in the Winter War

This is a list of Finnish divisions that existed during the Winter War, 1939–1940.
 1st Division
 2nd Division – renamed from 11th Division in 1940
 3rd Division – renamed from 6th Division in 1940
 4th Division
 5th Division
 6th Division – renamed to 3rd Division in 1940
 7th Division – renamed from 10th Division in 1940
 8th Division
 9th Division
 10th Division – renamed to 7th Division in 1940
 11th Division – renamed to 2nd Division in 1940
 12th Division
 13th Division
 21st Division – formed December 19, 1939
 22nd Division – formed December 19, 1939
 23rd Division – formed December 19, 1939

See also
 Finnish Army
 List of Finnish corps in the Continuation War
 List of Finnish corps in the Winter War
 List of Finnish divisions in the Continuation War

References
 
 

Winter War
Winter War
Winter War
Finnish divisions, Winter
Divisions, Winter
Finnish, Winter War